Andrei Vladimirovich Ryabykh (born 24 December 1978) is a former Russian professional football player.

Ryabykh played in the Russian Football National League with FC Sokol Saratov and FC Mordovia Saransk.

External links
 

1978 births
People from Balashov
Living people
Russian footballers
Association football midfielders
FC Sokol Saratov players
FC Mordovia Saransk players
Sportspeople from Saratov Oblast